Epos Ltd is a British loudspeaker company that specialises in home cinema and hi-fi speakers.

History
Epos was founded in 1983 by Robin Marshall. In 1988 Epos was sold to Mordaunt-Short who had been bought by the TGI PLC group in 1987. When the TGI PLC group decided to close the Epos/Mordaunt-Short operations in 1999, the Epos part was sold to Michael Creek, the owner and managing director of Creek Audio Ltd.

In 2020 Creek sold the Epos operation to Karl-Heinz Fink, founder of German speaker designer firm FinkTeam.

Products
Current Epos speakers are split into two ranges, the budget ELS series and the high end Mi series.

External links
 Official Site

References 

Loudspeaker manufacturers
Audio equipment manufacturers of the United Kingdom